The 2012 Australia Day Honours were appointments to various orders and honours to recognise and reward good works by Australian citizens. The list was announced on 26 January 2012 by the Governor General of Australia, Quentin Bryce.

The Australia Day Honours are the first of the two major annual honours lists, the first announced to coincide with Australia Day (26 January), with the other being the Queen's Birthday Honours, which are announced on the second Monday in June.

† indicates an award given posthumously.

Order of Australia

Companion (AC)

Officer (AO)

General Division

Military Division

Member (AM)

General Division

Military Division

Medal (OAM)

General Division

Military Division

Meritorious Service

Public Service Medal (PSM)

Australian Police Medal (APM)

Australian Fire Service Medal (AFSM)

Ambulance Service Medal (ASM)

Emergency Services Medal (ESM)

Gallantry, Distinguished and Conspicuous Service

Medal for Gallantry (MG)

Commendation for Gallantry

Bar to the Distinguished Service Cross

Distinguished Service Cross (DSC)

Bar to the Distinguished Service Medal

Distinguished Service Medal (DSM)

Commendation for Distinguished Service

Conspicuous Service Cross (CSC)

Conspicuous Service Medal (CSM)

References

External links
Australian Honours Lists, www.gg.gov.au
Australia Day 2012 Honours Lists , Governor-General of Australia: The Australian Honours Secretariat

2012 awards in Australia
Orders, decorations, and medals of Australia